Yannick Langesberg (born 31 March 1994) is a German professional footballer who plays as a defender for Regionalliga Südwest club TSV Steinbach Haiger.

References

External links
 
 

1994 births
Living people
People from Soest (district)
Sportspeople from Arnsberg (region)
German footballers
Footballers from North Rhine-Westphalia
Association football defenders
3. Liga players
Regionalliga players
Oberliga (football) players
Rot Weiss Ahlen players
SV Lippstadt 08 players
SC Verl players
Rot-Weiss Essen players